A partial lunar eclipse will take place on June 28, 2075.

Visibility 
It will be completely visible over most of the Pacific ocean, part of Australia, all of New Zealand, and parts of North and South America. It will be seen rising over East Asia, the rest of Australia, and setting over most of North America and the rest of South America.

Related lunar eclipses

Half-saros 
A lunar eclipse will be preceded and followed by solar eclipses by 9 years and 5.5 days (a half saros). This lunar eclipse is related to two total solar eclipses of Solar Saros 128.

See also 

 List of lunar eclipses and List of 21st-century lunar eclipses

References 

21st-century lunar eclipses
Lunar eclipses